The Union of Democratic Forces (СДС / SDS) is a political party in Bulgaria, founded in 1989 as a union of several political organizations in opposition to the communist government. The Union was transformed into a single unified party with the same name. The SDS is a member of the European People's Party (EPP). In the 1990s the party had the largest membership in the country, with one million members, but has since splintered into a number of small parties totaling no more than 40,000 members. The SDS proper had 12,000 members in 2016.

History 

Dissident groups formed under the faltering regime of Todor Zhivkov in the late 1980s were the basis for the Union. Once Zhivkov fell, a loose political confederation was envisioned where constituent groups could continue to work for their own cause, while the coordinating council would include three members from each organization. The Longtime dissident philosopher Zhelyu Zhelev, who would later become Bulgaria's president, was elected chairman, and Petar Beron, a well-known environmental scientist, was chosen as secretary.

The SDS was officially founded on 7 December 1989 as a union of eleven political organizations, such as Ekoglasnost, Bulgarian Social Democratic Workers' Party (United) and Bulgarian Agrarian People's Union "Nikola Petkov". The following year, six more parties were incorporated (Radical Democratic Party, Green Party of Bulgaria, Democratic Party, New Social Democratic Party, United Democratic Centre, Democratic Front).

The SDS lost the 1990 elections to the Bulgarian Socialist Party but still participated in the joint cabinet of Dimitar Iliev Popov. On 15 May 1991 39 members left the SDS because of disagreements with the draft of the new constitution and founded the new organizations SDS-Center and SDS-Liberals. Later the remnants of the SDS formed their own cabinet with Prime Minister Filip Dimitrov in November 1991, though the cabinet lasted only a little over a year when the government failed a motion of confidence in September 1992. The socialists, together with the Movement for Rights and Freedoms, formed a coalition government headed by Prof. Lyuben Berov. Following the resignation of Berov's cabinet in October 1994, the BSP went on to win the 1994 elections.

However, following discontent over economic problems, Prime Minister Zhan Videnov resigned at the end of 1996, clearing the way for new elections, this time won by the SDS with a crushing 55% vote. Party leader Ivan Kostov went on to form the new government and successfully passed several economic reforms. He was eventually rewarded in December 1999 with an invitation to begin membership talks with the European Union. But public discontent over the social cost of the reforms, including increased unemployment, as well as allegations of corruption led to the SDS's defeat in the June 2001 elections, which were won by the National Movement for Simeon II. The United Democratic Forces won 18.2% of the popular vote and 51 out of 240 seats.

The SDS was chaired until the May 20, 2007 European elections by Petar Stoyanov, former president of the country. Meanwhile, Kostov, the former Prime Minister and SDS party leader went on to form his own party - Democrats for a Strong Bulgaria. At the 2005 parliamentary election, the United Democratic Forces won 8.4% of the popular vote and 20 out of 240 seats.

It was announced at the inaugural conference of the Movement for European Reform (MER, March 2007) that the SDS would become official partners alongside the British Conservative Party and the Czech Civic Democratic Party. In mid April 2007, the SDS backtracked on its decision, stating that it remains loyal to the EPP and that it will never leave the EPP section of the EPP-ED Group to join another Group.

In the May 20, 2007 European elections the SDS failed to elect even a single MEP, resulting in the resignation of Stoyanov who led the list.

At the start of 2009 the SDS entered in an electoral alliance named the "Blue Coalition" with four other center-right parties: the DSB, the United Agrarians, the Bulgarian Social Democratic Party and the Radical Democratic Party. The alliance fielded candidates for the June 2009 European election winning a seat. When the Lisbon Treaty came into force in December of that year, their representation doubled. Now both the SDS and the DSB had an MEP.

The Blue coalition placed fifth in the legislative election a month later with a combined 6.8% of the vote and 15 seats.

In the May 2013 elections, the SDS ran alone and lost all of its seats in the Bulgarian National Assembly, but regained four next year as a part of the Reformist Bloc alliance. The same pattern repeated in 2017 and April of 2021, with zero and then two seats respectively (running together with GERB in 2021). Two other MPs joined the SDS later on.

Coalitions

United Democratic Forces 
For the 1997 parliamentary elections, an alliance named United Democratic Forces was formed around SDS. The same name was later used for other elections and parliamentary groups.

The Blue Coalition 
In early 2009 an alliance was formed together with Democrats for a Strong Bulgaria for the European Parliament elections and National Assembly elections. The coalition was named the Blue Coalition and included some other parties.

The Reformist Bloc 
The coalition agreement to form the alliance of the Reformist Bloc was signed on 20 December 2013. The five parties that signed the agreement were the Union of Democratic Forces, Democrats for a Strong Bulgaria, Bulgaria for Citizens Movement, People's Party Freedom and Dignity, and the Bulgarian Agrarian National Union.

GERB 
Since 2019 the party is in a coalition with GERB.

List of chairmen 

Chairmen of the Coordination Council
 Zhelyu Zhelev (1989–1990)
 Petar Beron (1990)
 Filip Dimitrov (1990–1994)
 Ivan Kostov (1994–1997)

Chairmen and Chairwomen of the unified party
 Ivan Kostov (1997–2001)
 Ekaterina Mihailova (2001–2002)
 Nadezhda Mihailova (2002–2005)
 Petar Stoyanov (2005–2007)
 Plamen Yurukov (2007–2008)
 Martin Dimitrov (2008–2012)
 Emil Kabaivanov (2012–2013)
 Bozhidar Lukarski (2013–2018)
 Rumen Hristov (2018–present)

Election results

See also

References

External links
Official website
Bulgarian Subject Files - Political Parties: Union of Democratic Forces, Blinken Open Society Archives, Budapest

 
1989 establishments in Bulgaria
Political parties established in 1989